Institute of Mental Health may refer to: 

Hospitals and research facilities:
Institute of Mental Health (Erragadda), an institution in Hyderabad, Andhra Pradesh.
Institute of Mental Health (Singapore), an institution in Singapore
Institute of Mental Health (Belgrade), an institution in Belgrade, Serbia
National Institute of Mental Health, a research facility in the United States